Brian Kaltak (born 30 September 1993) is a Vanuatuan international footballer who plays for Australian club Central Coast Mariners as a central defender, and the Vanuatu national team.

Career
Kaltak has played club football with Waterside Karori, Hekari United, Solomon Warriors, Amicale, Erakor Golden Star and Tasman United.

Kaltak trained with A-League club Wellington Phoenix from July 2011 until late January 2012 after being invited by coach Ricki Herbert and receiving $15,000 in financial support from Oceania Football Confederation to cover costs.

Auckland City

On 3 October 2018, Kaltak signed for Auckland City. He scored his first goal for the club on 27 January 2019, scoring from a free kick in a 3–2 win over Eastern Suburbs.  In 2020, Kaltak became the first ni-Vanuatu to win the New Zealand Football Championship as a player.

Australia

In April 2022, Kaltak went on trial with A-League Men club Central Coast Mariners. He signed for Australian club FK Beograd in June 2022 along with fellow Vanuatu international Jeffrey Tasso, before returning to Central Coast on trial in August 2022, prior to the start of the 2022–23 A-League Men season.

Kaltak signed for Central Coast Mariners on 27 September 2022.

International career
Kaltak made his international debut for Vanuatu in 2011.

In March 2022, Kaltak went to Qatar for the World Cup qualifiers. Vanuatu's first match was scheduled against Tahiti on 17 March 2022, but the team was forced to withdraw from the tournament without playing a game due to a COVID-19 outbreak among the travelling contingent.

Personal life
Kaltak was born in Erakor, and moved to Port Vila to obtain his secondary education. Brian's cousins Tony and Jean also play for the national team. The pair were both named in the 2012 OFC Nations Cup squad.

In 2021, Kaltak told the New Zealand High Commission in Vanuatu that he believed athletes should avoid tobacco as part of World No Tobacco Day.

Produced by Fulwell 73, FIFA released Captains in 2022, an eight-part sports docuseries following six national team captains in their respective 2022 FIFA World Cup qualification campaigns. Kaltak, representing Vanuatu, starred alongside Thiago Silva (Brazil), Luka Modrić (Croatia), Pierre-Emerick Aubameyang (Gabon), Andre Blake (Jamaica) and Hassan Maatouk (Lebanon). It was released by Netflix and also shown on FIFA's own streaming platform, FIFA+.

Career statistics

International

Vanuatu score listed first, score column indicates score after each Kaltak goal.

References

1993 births
Living people
Vanuatuan footballers
Vanuatu international footballers
Waterside Karori players
Hekari United players
Solomon Warriors F.C. players
Amicale F.C. players
Erakor Golden Star F.C. players
Tasman United players
2012 OFC Nations Cup players
2016 OFC Nations Cup players
Association football defenders
Vanuatuan expatriate footballers
Vanuatuan expatriate sportspeople in New Zealand
Expatriate association footballers in New Zealand
Vanuatuan expatriate sportspeople in Papua New Guinea
Expatriate footballers in Papua New Guinea
Vanuatuan expatriate sportspeople in the Solomon Islands
Expatriate footballers in the Solomon Islands
Auckland City FC players
New Zealand Football Championship players
People from Shefa Province
Vanuatu youth international footballers
Vanuatu under-20 international footballers
Vanuatuan expatriate sportspeople in Australia
Expatriate soccer players in Australia
FK Beograd (Australia) players
Central Coast Mariners FC players